Michael Cannon Rea is an American analytic philosopher and, since 2017, John A. O'Brien Professor of Philosophy at the University of Notre Dame. He delivered the 2017 Gifford Lecture on divine hiddenness.

Work 

In World Without Design: The Ontological Consequences of Naturalism, Rea argues that naturalists are not justified in accepting either realism about material objects, or realism about other minds, or materialism.

Bibliography 
 World Without Design: The Ontological Consequences of Naturalism. Oxford: Oxford University Press (Clarendon), 2002
 Introduction to the Philosophy of Religion (with Michael Murray). Cambridge: Cambridge University Press, 2008.
 Metaphysics: The Basics, London: Routledge (under contract)

Edited books 
 Material Constitution: A Reader.  Lanham, MD: Rowman & Littlefield, 1997. 
 Philosophy of Religion: An Anthology, 5th edition (with Louis P. Pojman). Belmont, CA: Wadsworth, 2007. 
 Critical Concepts in Philosophy: Metaphysics, 5 vols., London: Routledge, 2008. 
 Oxford Handbook of Philosophical Theology (with Thomas P. Flint). Oxford: Oxford University Press, 2009. 
 Analytic Theology: New Essays in Theological Method (with Oliver D. Crisp). Oxford: Oxford University Press, 2009. 
 Arguing About Metaphysics.  New York: Routledge, 2009. 
 Philosophical and Theological Essays on the Trinity (with Thomas McCall), Oxford: Oxford University Press, 2009. 
 Oxford Readings in Philosophical Theology, 2 vols.  Oxford: Oxford University Press, 2009. 
 Divine Evil?  The Moral Character of the God of Abraham (with Michael Bergmann and Michael Murray). Oxford University Press, under contract.

References

External links 
 Official website

21st-century American philosophers
American Christian writers
Analytic philosophers
Calvinist and Reformed philosophers
Critics of atheism
Living people
Metaphysicians
Philosophers of religion
Presidents of the Society of Christian Philosophers
University of Notre Dame faculty
Year of birth missing (living people)